Androsthenes of Thessaly was called by Julius Caesar the praetor of the country (by which he means merely the military commander). He shut the gates of Gomfoi against Caesar in 48 BCE, after Caesar's defeat at the hands of Pompey in the Battle of Dyrrhachium. When Caesar inevitability breached the walls, the aristocrats and magistrates, likely including Androsthenes committed suicide.

Notes

 

Ancient Thessalians
1st-century BC Greek people
Roman Republican civil wars
Government of Roman Macedonia